is a Japanese politician of the Initiatives from Osaka party, a member of the House of Councillors in the Diet (national legislature). A native of Amagasaki and dropout of Otemon Gakuin University, he served in the city assembly of Amagasaki for one term since 1983 and in the assembly of Hyōgo Prefecture for two terms since 1991. After two unsuccessful runs in 1996 and 2000, he  was elected to the House of Representatives for the first time in 2003. He lost the seat in 2005 but was elected to the House of Councillors for the first time in 2007.

References

External links 
 Official website in Japanese.

1947 births
Living people
People from Amagasaki
Members of the House of Representatives (Japan)
Members of the House of Councillors (Japan)
Members of the Hyogo Prefectural Assembly
Democratic Party of Japan politicians
Nippon Ishin no Kai politicians
21st-century Japanese politicians